The 1962 Western Michigan Broncos football team represented Western Michigan University in the Mid-American Conference (MAC) during the 1962 NCAA University Division football season.  In their sixth season under head coach Merle Schlosser, the Broncos compiled a 5–4 record (3–3 against MAC opponents), finished in fourth place in the MAC, and outscored their opponents, 158 to 112.  The team played its home games at Waldo Stadium in Kalamazoo, Michigan.

The team's statistical leaders included Roger Theder with 824 passing yards, Bill Schlee with 599 rushing yards, and Jim Bednar with 255 receiving yards. Center Mike Maul and quarterback Roger Theder were the team captains. Fullback Bill Schlee received the team's most outstanding player award.

Schedule

See also
 1962 in Michigan

References

Western Michigan
Western Michigan Broncos football seasons
Western Michigan Broncos football